1111 Third Avenue is a  high-rise office building located in downtown Seattle, Washington. It was completed in 1980 and has 34 floors. At the time of the completion, it became the 8th tallest building in Seattle. It is owned and operated by Unico Properties. It has an award-winning outdoor landscaped area with seating and tables accented by bronze statues by sculptor Robert Graham, and floor to ceiling windows. The exterior of the building is composed of precast concrete with exposed aggregate surfaces and dual-glazed, solar bronze glass.

See also
List of tallest buildings in Seattle

References

External links

Skyscraper office buildings in Seattle
Office buildings completed in 1980
Leadership in Energy and Environmental Design basic silver certified buildings
Downtown Seattle
1980 establishments in Washington (state)